Great Orton is a village in the parish of Orton, in the City of Carlisle district of the English county of Cumbria. The population of the civil parish taken at the 2011 census was 453. Historically, the village is part of Cumberland.


Location 
Great Orton is close to England's border with Scotland. The English city of Carlisle lies about five miles to the east, whereas the Scottish town of Gretna lies just eight miles to the north..

Amenities 
Great Orton has a primary school with nursery, a pub (the Wellington), a church (St Giles), a village hall and a butcher's shop (R J Mulholland). The village hall is available to hire and you can find more information at https://web.archive.org/web/20140328160249/http://www.greatortonvillagehall.co.uk/

Nearby settlements  
Nearby settlements include the city of Carlisle, the villages of Thursby, Little Orton, Kirkbampton, Thurstonfield, Moorhouse, Wiggonby and the hamlet of Orton Rigg.

Transport 
For transport there is the B5307 road, the A595 road and the A596 road. There is also Carlisle railway station about six miles away.

See also

Listed buildings in Orton, Carlisle

References

External links

 Cumbria County History Trust: Great Orton (nb: provisional research only – see Talk page)
 https://web.archive.org/web/20140328160249/http://www.greatortonvillagehall.co.uk/
 http://www.thewellingtongreatorton.robinsonsbrewery.com
 https://web.archive.org/web/20100227025009/http://www.visitcumbria.com/car/greatorton.htm
 http://www.greatorton.cumbria.sch.uk

Villages in Cumbria
City of Carlisle